Muhammed Enes Kiprit (born 9 July 1999) is a professional footballer who plays as a forward for 1. FC Kaiserslautern. He represented both Germany and, most recently, Turkey at youth level.

Club career
A youth product of Hertha BSC, Kiprit signed his first professional contract with them on 11 May 2018. Kiprit was loaned to Wacker Innsbruck in Austria in February 2019. Kiprit made his professional debut with Wacker Innsbruck in a 3–0 Austrian Football Bundesliga loss to FC Admira Wacker Mödling on 23 February 2019.

He signed for KFC Uerdingen on a two-year contract in September 2020. He scored 9 goals in 36 appearances in the 3. Liga.

Kiprit moved to 1. FC Kaiserslautern in July 2021.

International career
Kiprit was born in Germany and is of Turkish descent, and represented both countries at a youth level. Originally a youth international for Turkey, Kiprit represented the Germany national under-19 team once in 2018. He then switched back to represent the Turkey U21s.

References

External links
 
 
 
 
 

1999 births
Living people
Footballers from Berlin
Turkish footballers
Turkey youth international footballers
German footballers
Association football forwards
Germany youth international footballers
German people of Turkish descent
FC Wacker Innsbruck (2002) players
Hertha BSC II players
KFC Uerdingen 05 players
1. FC Kaiserslautern players
Austrian Football Bundesliga players
3. Liga players
Regionalliga players
Turkish expatriate footballers
German expatriate footballers
Turkish expatriate sportspeople in Austria
German expatriate sportspeople in Austria
Expatriate footballers in Austria